Holmes Island may refer to:

Holmes Island (Antarctica), an island
Holmes Island (Indiana), an island and community
Holmes Island (Washington), an island